Rosiane Modesto de Oliveira (born in 20 February 1978) is a Brazilian politician and teacher, currently serving her first term as a federal deputy of Mato Grosso do Sul. She was previously Vice Governor of Mato Grosso do Sul from January 2015 to January 2019 in the government of Reinaldo Azambuja. Her tenure was between January 2015 and April 2016 Secretary of Human Rights, Social Assistance and Labor of Mato Grosso do Sul during the government of Reinaldo Azambuja.

Born in Fátima do Sul, she is the youngest of five children of a farming couple. Her brother, Rinaldo Modesto, is a state deputy. Rose was raised in Culturama from her birth until 1984, when her family moved to Campo Grande. In 1999, she started an undergraduate history course at the Dom Bosco Catholic University. After completing graduation, she started teaching in public schools in Campo Grande.

She began doing social work at the Padre Tomaz Girardelli Municipal School, where she created the "Learning with Music" project, and later the "Tocando em Frente" project, which currently offers art, sports and school tutoring classes.

Councillor (2008) 

In 2008, she was elected a councillor of Campo Grande with 7,536 votes (1.87%). In 2012, she was re-elected with 10,813 votes (2.50%), being the second most voted.

Elections in 2014 

On June 26, 2014, it was announced that Rose would be a candidate for Lieutenant Governor in that year's state elections of the "Novo Tempo" coalition, headed by Reinaldo Azambuja, also from the PSDB. The coalition had the support of six parties and had the second most television time. On October 6, Reinaldo and Rose were classified for the second round with 39.09% of the valid votes. On October 26, they were elected with 741,516 votes, equivalent to 55.34% of the valid votes.

Vice Governor of Mato Grosso do Sul (2015) 

On January 1, 2015, she took office as deputy governor of Mato Grosso do Sul, succeeding Simone Tebet. In addition to her vice-governor duties, she was also appointed Secretary of State for Human Rights, Social Assistance and Labor, leaving office in April 2016 to run for the party's nomination for the candidacy for mayor of Campo Grande.

She was made officially a pre-candidate in April and formalized as a candidate in July, with the businessman and superintendent director of the Brazilian Service to Support Micro and Small Companies in Mato Grosso do Sul (Sebrae-MS) as vice on the ticket. Both qualified for the second round with 26.62% of the valid votes, but were defeated by a difference of 72,216 votes.

Chamber of Deputies (2018) 

In early 2018, she declared that she would not run for re-election as Lieutenant Governor. In August, she was nominated by the party to run for a seat in the Chamber of Deputies, being elected with 120,901 votes, the highest proportional vote.

Elections in 2022 

In the 2022 elections, Rose ran for governor of Mato Grosso do Sul for União Brasil (UNIÃO). With the polls totalled, she received 178,599 votes, placing 4th, out of the second round disputed by Renan Contar (PRTB) and Eduardo Riedel (PSDB).

Controversies, complaints, and lawsuits 
In May 2016, the State Attorney General of Justice, Paulo Passos, asked the Court of Justice to open an investigation against the deputy governor under Operation Coffee Break, which investigates an alleged corruption scheme in the impeachment process by Alcides Bernal as mayor of Campo Grande in 2014. At the time, Rose was a city councilwoman and voted for the mayor's term of office to be revoked, justifying that her vote had been technical and based on data from the Processing Commission. Regarding the procedure presented by Passos, she declared: "At no time was my vote conditioned to any type of benefit, whether of office or financial resources."

In July 2016, the state attorney general requested the breach of the vice governor's bank and tax secrecy. She denied publicizing the data and her negative certificates were made available on the campaign website. In August, when registering her candidacy for mayor of Campo Grande, Rose said she did not know how much she declared in assets and stated that she earned little. According to the Transparency Portal, the deputy governor has a salary of R$ 24,376.89, receiving a net amount of R$ 18,170.67.

References 

1978 births

Living people
Brazilian Social Democracy Party politicians
Deputy Governor of Mato Grosso do Sul
Members of the Chamber of Deputies (Brazil) from Mato Grosso do Sul
Cidadania politicians
Women city councillors in Brazil